HY4 is a four seat hydrogen fuel cell powered aircraft.  It made its maiden flight on 29 September 2016 from Stuttgart Airport.  It was designed by DLR Institute of Engineering Thermodynamics of the German Aerospace Center, based on the Taurus G4, manufactured by Pipistrel.

References

External links

2010s German experimental aircraft
Hydrogen-powered aircraft
Zero-emissions vehicles
Fuel cell vehicles